Yongsin Wongpanitnont (born April 11, 2002), also known as Yorch (is a Thai actor and model. He is best known for his role as Wanchaloem in Thong Nuea Kao (2013).

Career

2012–2021: Career beginnings
Yorch began his career as a child actor in 2012, at the age of 10. Since then, he has appeared in many television dramas, including Thong Nuea Kao (2013), Luead Mungkorn: Singh (2015) and Wai Sab Saraek Kad 2 (2019). In 2018, Yorch auditioned for SM Entertainment. However, he wasn't able to become a trainee due to his contract with Thai TV3.

2022–present: Trainee A
On January 20, 2022, Yorch was revealed to be a member of Big Hit Music's upcoming boy group with the tentative name Trainee A. However, the debut project was later cancelled and Trainee A's all social media channels ended their services on December 23, 2022.

Filmography

Films

Television series

Awards and nominations

References

External links

2002 births
Living people
Yongsin Wongpanitnont
Yongsin Wongpanitnont
Yongsin Wongpanitnont
Thai television actors
Hybe Corporation artists
Yongsin Wongpanitnont
Yongsin Wongpanitnont
Thai expatriates in South Korea